Alisattar Alasgar oghlu Atakishiyev (25 December 1906 - 7 November 1990) was an Azerbaijani and Soviet cameraman, screenwriter and artist, an  (1960), and director of children's science fiction films.

Biography 
Alisattar Atakishiyev was born on 25 December 1906 in Baku. From childhood he became interested in drawing, in 1927 he left for Moscow, where he entered the All-Union Art and Technical School. In 1930, after graduating from college, he returned to Baku, got a job as a graphic designer at a film studio. After working only a year at this job, he decided to enter the camera department of the All-Union State Institute of Cinematography. After graduating from the institute in 1936, Alisattar Atakishiyev remained in Moscow and began working at Mosfilm.

In 1938, director , invited to the Baku Film Studio, invited Atakishiyev to be the cameraman of the film . In 1943, Atakishiyev worked as a director of photography in the film A Family. In 1944, a decision was made to film the musical comedy by Uzeyir Hajibeyov The Cloth Peddler . The film was a great success and went around movie screens all over the world. In 1947 he worked as a director of photography in the film . This film was banned and only 10 years later was released to the screens in the second edition. After that, documentary films Soviet Azerbaijan, Morning Song (1950), Health Centers in Azerbaijan (1951), To the Native People (1954) were shot.

Atakishiyev was officially appointed not only as the chief operator, but also as a costume designer.

Together with director , the film On Distant Shores was shot, which was released in 1958.

In 1961 Atakishiyev directed the film . In 1964, he made the film The Magic Gown, which became a favorite for a whole generation of children in the 1960s.

In 1970, A. Atakishiyev's book The Adventures of Ibrahim was published, intended for children.

Atakishiyev died on 7 November 1990 at the age of 84 in Moscow. He was buried at the Kuntsevo Cemetery.

Sources 
 Azerbaijani Soviet Encyclopedia, Volume 1.
Азербайджанские известия. 15 июля 2006 года. стр. 3.

References 

Azerbaijani film directors
Soviet film directors
Azerbaijani screenwriters
1906 births
1990 deaths
Film people from Baku
Burials at Kuntsevo Cemetery
Honored Art Workers of the Azerbaijan SSR
Recipients of the Order of the Red Banner of Labour
Azerbaijani cinematographers
Soviet cinematographers
Gerasimov Institute of Cinematography alumni